Biro-Biro is born Antônio José da Silva Filho, a Brazilian footballer born in 1959 .

Biro-Biro may also refer to:

Biro-Biro (footballer, born 1964), born Gilberto Ribeiro de Carvalho, a Brazilian footballer born in 1964 
Biro-Biro (footballer, born 1974) (born 1964), born João Bosco Gualberto de Freitas, a Brazilian footballer born in 1974
Biro Biro, born Diego Santos Gama Camilo, a Brazilian footballer born in 1994